Danica Curcic (born 27 August 1985) is a Serbian-Danish actress.

Biography 
Curcic was born in Belgrade. At the age of one, she moved to Copenhagen with her family where her father worked at the Yugoslavian embassy. Danica Curcic attended Sankt Annæ Gymnasium before obtaining a bachelor's degree in film and media studies from the University of Copenhagen. She then spent a year in California where she took acting classes at the Dell'Arte International School of Physical Theatre before enrolling at the Danish National School of Performing Arts, graduating in 2012.

Career 
Curcic had her feature film debut in Over kanten in 2012. In 2014, she received a Shooting Star Award at the Berlin International Film Festival in 2014. In 2015, she received a Danish Film Critics Association Award for Best Actress for her role in Bille August's Silent Heart.

Filmography

Film

Television

References

External links 
 

1985 births
Actresses from Belgrade
Best Actress Bodil Award winners
Danish film actresses
Danish people of Serbian descent
Danish television actresses
Living people
University of Copenhagen alumni